Carol Diane Joyce (born 29 December 1981) is a South African Olympic sprint canoer.

Joyce was born in Port Shepstone, and competed during the late 2000s. At the 2008 Summer Olympics in Beijing, she finished seventh in the K-4 500 m event.

References
 Sports-Reference.com profile

1981 births
Living people
People from Port Shepstone
White South African people
South African female canoeists
Olympic canoeists of South Africa
Canoeists at the 2008 Summer Olympics